Monte Grande Radio Station was a VLF-transmission site for oversea wireless telegraphy at Monte Grande near Buenos Aires, Argentina. It used a T-shaped antenna installed on ten masts, of which eight had a height of 210 metres and two a height of 219 metres. The station was inaugurated on January 24, 1924, at the presence of Argentinian president Marcelo Torcuato de Alvear. At the time of inauguration the station used machine transmitters. The station worked on 23.6 kHz with 72.1 kW.

External links 

 http://www.albinarrate.com/content/transradio/Revista%20Telegrafica%201924-01%20-%20Transradio%20Internacional.pdf
 http://www.laguna-rocha.com.ar/2014/01/el-25-de-enero-del-corriente-ha-de-ser.html

Towers in Argentina